Koba (written: 木庭, 木場 or 古葉) is a Japanese surname. Notable people with the surname include:

, Japanese politician
, Japanese sport shooter
, Japanese baseball player and manager

Japanese-language surnames